Malachians Football Club is an intermediate Northern Irish football club playing in the Premier Division of the Northern Amateur Football League. The club was formed in 1963 as the football section of the St Malachy's College Old Boys' Association, and joined the Amateur League in 1967, achieving intermediate status in 1977.

External links
 Malachians Official Club website
 nifootball.co.uk - (For fixtures, results and tables of all Northern Ireland amateur football leagues)

Notes

Association football clubs in Northern Ireland
Association football clubs established in 1963
Northern Amateur Football League clubs
Association football clubs in Belfast
1963 establishments in Northern Ireland